Janet Aldrich (born Janet Wallerich; October 16, 1956 in Hinsdale, Illinois) is an American actress and singer known for her work on Broadway in musical theater and television. She is represented by Dulcina Eisen Associates, New York City.

Career
Aldrich debuted on Broadway in 1982 in Annie. She won the 1986 Helen Hayes Award for Outstanding Actress, Resident Musical, for her work in Forbidden Broadway as well as a Victoire de la Musique for her portrayal of Sally Bowles in Cabaret in Paris, France, in 1987. In 2017, Aldrich won the Outstanding Individual Performance Award for her portrayal of Sophie Tucker in the original musical Ben, Virginia & Me (The Liberace Musical) at the New York Musical Festival. She was nominated for a Connecticut Critics Choice Award for her work as Rose in Song of Singapore and a Philadelphia Inquirer Critics Choice Award for her portrayal of the Baker's Wife in Into The Woods in 1992.

Personal life 
Aldrich is the daughter of George and Frances Wallerich. She is married to Carlos Valdes-Dapena, with whom she has two children and two grandchildren and resides in West Orange, New Jersey.

Filmography

Stage productions

Television productions

See also 

 Guiding Light
 Victoires de la Musique
 Helen Hayes Awards

References

External links 
 
 
 Janet Aldrich Biography: NJ Theater
 Janet Aldrich: Ibdb
 New York Times Theater Review
 New York Times Theater Review
 New York Times Theater Review
 New York Times Theater Review
 New York Times: Helen Hayes Awards Are Presented
 New York Times Theatre Review

Living people
1956 births
American musical theatre actresses
American soap opera actors
21st-century American women